Matilde Throup Sepúlveda (18 August 1876 – 1922) was the first Chilean woman to receive the title of attorney, and the third to obtain a professional title after the institution of the  of 1877 which allowed women to be admitted to universities.

Biography

Matilde Throup Sepúlveda was born in Angol in 1876, the daughter of a former Chilean Army soldier. On 28 March 1887 she obtained a Bachelor of Philosophy and Humanities degree. She subsequently applied to study at the University of Chile's , where she received a Bachelor of Law and Political Science on 25 May 1891.

On 6 June 1892 she obtained a Licentiate of Laws, becoming the first Chilean woman to receive a university degree, which enabled her to receive the title of attorney granted by the Supreme Court. The second woman to become an attorney was Matilde Brandau, in 1898. Throup's degree was used as a precedent by Belgium and Argentina when granting the title of attorney to women.

It opined that a woman could not serve in the post, and this view was endorsed by the Court of Appeals in an order published 6 April 1893. Throup appealed to the Supreme Court, which overturned the initial decision on 23 September 1893, setting a precedent regarding the right of women to hold public offices requiring the title of attorney, with the same conditions as for men.

Throup later competed for the posts of officer of the Civil Registry and Identification Service for Santiago, and notary public of Santiago. She was accepted for both exams, and in the latter case was included in the short list from which the position was chosen by the government.

Matilde Throup died in 1922 at age 46.

See also
 First women lawyers around the world

References

External links
 

1876 births
1922 deaths
Chilean people of English descent
Chilean women lawyers
People from Angol
University of Chile alumni
19th-century women lawyers